Sir David Ogilby (?1755-1834) was an Irish-born officer in the East India Company's Madras Army who was knighted for his service in the Anglo-Mysore Wars.

Birth and early life
He was among the numerous children of Alexander Ogilby, "an eminent bleacher and linendraper" of Limavady, County Londonderry, and his wife Mary (born Alexander). His father had captained a militia company in the 1750s, but otherwise there was no prior military tradition in his family.

Like much else concerning David Ogilby, his date of birth cannot be stated with certainty. An early source, closely identified with Ogilby himself, states that he was born on 3 August 1755 and served with the Irish Volunteers from the age of 14 or 15. These two details are difficult to reconcile because the Limavady Battalion of the Volunteers was not formed until 7 November 1777, but a birthdate of 1755 is supported by Ogilby's reported age of 78 at death in 1834. Another source, consciously contradicting the first, gives his date of birth as 3 August 1767, but he had definitely been born by 6 March 1766 when named in a lease of lands at Ballyhenry, County Londonderry.

In about 1780 he obtained an East India Company cadetship and, having attended Lewis Lochee's military academy in Little Chelsea, he embarked for India early in 1782. Within a fortnight of his arrival at Madras he was, through the influence of Paul Benfield, commissioned ensign in a Native Infantry corps in the southern army.

Military service 1782–1802
He first saw action in the attacks on Tipu Sultan's garrisons at Panchalankurichi, Sivagiri and Palakkad Fort in the latter part of 1783. In the first of these engagements the British force withdrew after "considerable slaughter on both sides" and Ogilby and his men were left to cover the retreat and bring off the wounded.

In the same year he had temporary command of his battalion when, on picket duty at Coimbatore, it successfully resisted an attack by a large body of Tipu's cavalry, and he was jointly responsible for moving some 20,000 cattle and sheep to supply the army assembled at Dharapuram. When later engaged on a similar movement of stock with a small detachment of sepoys, he had to beat a 15-mile retreat over the open plains of Dharapuram under repeated attack by a mounted force of 400. The Second Mysore War ended shortly afterwards.

Having successfully applied for appointment to the 1st Madras European Regiment, he was soon given command of a company on the general staff of the army. He was later promoted lieutenant and, following outbreak of the Third Mysore War and the capture of Dharapuram in 1790, had command of the native troop detachments forming part of the garrison there. 

Returning to field service in command of a grenadier company, he distinguished himself by his valour at the taking of the important stronghold of Dindigul in July 1790 and was appointed Fort Adjutant. He remained in that post until 1796, strengthening the allegiance of several Polygar leaders to the East India Company and bringing the extensive and fertile valley of Dindigul under control by obtaining surrender of the fortress of Uthamapalayam, for which achievement he received special thanks from Government. The surrender of Uthamapalayam was accomplished after he took hostage two Polygar chiefs who professed loyalty to the Company but exposed their treachery when conversing in the Tamil language in Ogilby's presence, not realising he was proficient in their tongue. 

From 1796 to 1800 he had command of the garrison at Namakkal, with responsibility for holding in check the strong outpost of Karur. He later claimed that, prior to the outbreak of the Fourth Mysore War, he submitted to Lord Clive plans for the surprise and reduction of the forts of Karur, Erode, Dharapuram, Coimbatore and Calumbaum, pledging to take Karur at the head of half his garrison or die in the attempt; the submission was said to have utilised intelligence he obtained by entering Karur in disguise, and to have been favourably received but not adopted because of the need to maintain supplies from the relevant districts for the grand army at Seringapatam.

In 1796 he was, with other lieutenants in the East India Company service (HEICS), given the brevet rank of captain in His Majesty's army and in 1798 he was promoted captain-lieutenant in the HEICS. Few European constitutions were considered equal to twenty years' service in the Indian climate, and in 1800 Ogilby was at Madras and about to go on furlough due to deteriorating health when he learned that his corps was among those General Wellesley had assembled at Chitradurga to suppress the insurgency of Dhondia Wagh. He immediately travelled 600 miles inland to take part in the defeat of Wagh's forces. He eventually left India on furlough in 1802, sailing from Bombay for America on 22 May.

America, knighthood and marriage
In 1798 Ogilby had buried his companion Ann Campbell in the cemetery at Tiruchirappalli where he had previously laid their four children to rest. In 1802 he met, at Boston, Massachusetts, Mary Tyler Cooke, the orphaned nineteen-year-old niece of judge and playwright Royall Tyler, and in early winter the pair sailed for Liverpool, claiming to have married. They were at Limavady by 1804 when Mary gave birth to a daughter who died in May.

On 29 January 1804 Ogilby was dubbed a knight bachelor at Dublin Castle by the Earl of Hardwicke, the Lord Lieutenant of Ireland, a Dublin newspaper reporting "The reputation of this deserving officer had prepared Lord Hardwicke to estimate his character, and his excellency was pleased, publicly, to confer upon him the honour of knighthood, in consideration of a series of zealous and meritorious services to his country, during the long and arduous period of twenty-two years in the East Indies". The knighthood was one of only three bestowed by Hardwicke during his time as Lord Lieutenant, 1801-1806; his selections appear idiosyncratic.

Ogilby's accolade was promptly followed by publication of a congratulatory account of his military service in Walker's Hibernian Magazine. This was reproduced in the Madras-based Government Gazette, prefaced by remarks critical of its objectivity.

Accompanied by "Lady Ogilby", he proceeded to London and in October was promoted Major, 9th Native Infantry, in succession to James Achilles Kirkpatrick. In the following year the couple's "beautiful new chariot, built purposefully for India" was damaged outside the Opera House in Covent Garden, and in 1806 they were based in Norfolk Street, Grosvenor Square, and preparing to depart for Madras. In April The Lady's Monthly Museum published "A Biographical Sketch of Lady Ogilby" which included a highly coloured account of Ogilby's courtship of her and extolled her beauty, benevolence, refinement, elegance and literary talent in terms such that her aunt assumed the piece was self-written.

The Lady's Monthly sketch recalled that, during Ogilby's time in America, he "traversed a considerable tract of the interior" and rewarded the hospitality of those whom he met by presenting them with seeds he had collected from Tahiti, India and Mauritius and instructing them in the appropriate methods of cultivation.

On 27 May 1806 Ogilby and Mary Tyler Cook (described as spinster, of Portsea, Hampshire, and Roxbury, Massachusetts) were married at St Mary's Parish Church, Portsea, by Bishop's Licence. Their infant son and daughter had been baptised in a Unitarian chapel at Portsmouth on the previous day. A fortnight later the family sailed for India on the Lord Eldon, arriving at Calcutta in November.

Military service 1807–1809
Ogilby rejoined the 9th Native Infantry at Fort St George in March 1807 and was promoted Lieutenant-Colonel in May 1808. He commanded the regiment's 1st Battalion and was next senior officer to Major-General Robert Croker who had charge of the Ceded District of Bellary. Ogilby's return to India coincided with an upsurge of discontent among officers of the Madras Army due to reduction of their financial benefits. By July 1809 a major failure of military discipline gripped southern India, with many officers treating their troops as their own private armies. To isolate the most mutinous element, all officers were called on to pledge that they would act in support of the government. 

Ogilby signed the pledge but added he did so "to show I am conscientiously of opinion that the support of Government in this country is necessary to the general welfare of the empire; in every other sense it is from me a fruitless declaration". He had, shortly beforehand, written to the Commander in Chief requesting permission to take retirement because "a long declining state of health and recent severe mental affliction" had rendered him "entirely unable to conduct the duties of a station of so much responsibility". The mental affliction to which he referred was the death of Lady Ogilby in June.

Having regarded Ogilby as the only field officer to whom he could look for support in dealing with the difficult circumstances that beset his command, Major-General Croker placed on record his disappointment with Ogilby's failure to exert influence over junior ranks. In Croker's opinion, neither Ogilby's ill health nor his bereavement excused this. On 9 August Governor Sir George Barlow expressed concern at "how little assistance" Ogilby had provided "on so trying an occasion".

Authority for Ogilby's retirement on full pay was confirmed in October, but he had left his post four days after Barlow's expression of concern. With him he took his three children (one born in India) and his wife’s remains.

Later years
In May 1814 he remarried at St Clement Danes, his bride being Elizabeth Dunkin (otherwise Duncan). Five months later "the elegant Lady Ogilby" was reported to have bought "all the principal splendid ornaments of Her Royal Highness the Princess of Wales's two drawing-rooms at the sale at Connaught House" which followed the Princess vacating the property and removing to Italy.

Following the coronation of George IV, Ogilby was presented to the King by Lord Howden (former Commander-in-Chief of the Madras Army) and he was afterwards several times in attendance at Court. When Lady Ogilby accompanied him at St James's Palace in May 1824, a newspaper report of her attire (which included a headdress comprising "a profusion of diamonds and ostrich feathers") occupied ten lines of print. In 1823 the couple sued Mr and Mrs John Channon for defamation, alleging that Mrs Channon had falsely disparaged them in retaliation for Lady Ogilby refusing to introduce her at the Royal Drawing Room in April 1822. The case (which the Ogilbys' counsel opened by referring to Sir David as a "gentleman of rank who has acquired a high reputation by his public services") relied upon letters said to be in Mrs Channon's hand, but the jury was not satisfied she had written them and the Ogilbys' case was lost.

In 1820 Ogilby and his cousin, William Law Ogilby, had entered into partnership as merchants, agents and shipbrokers in the Irish provisions trade, carrying on business from Ingram Court, Fenchurch Street. The partnership was declared bankrupt in 1826. Despite this financial setback, Sir David Ogilby was able to remain active in fashionable social circles. He was presented to William IV in October 1830 and took a cottage at Brighton in anticipation of the King's arrival there in 1832.

Death and family members
On 9 August 1834, as he returned to his house, Fromer Lodge at Friern Barnet, after dining with his sister, his four-wheeled chaise (drawn by a single blind horse) overturned into a ditch, trapping him underneath. His body was removed to The Bull at Whetstone where life was pronounced extinct. He died intestate, and his personal effects were valued at no more than £50 when administration of his estate was granted.

His widow lived latterly at Brandenburg Lodge, Fulham, where she died in 1854. Of her several children by Ogilby, David Fitzroy Ogilby (1815-71) was commissioned in the 6th Foot and presented at Court in 1839, served in Canada, and retired in the rank of captain in 1848, becoming a cotton waste dealer in Manchester. The son of Ogilby's first marriage, Augustus Beaufort Ogilby (1804-34), served with the 27th Bengal Native Infantry and was Acting Quartermaster and Interpreter at Hansi when he died a few weeks before his father. Ogilby's sixteen-year-old daughter Isabel Georgina also predeceased her father by a matter of weeks.

Among the several husbands of Sir David's actress granddaughter, Edith Alice Ogilby, was Hart O. Berg (married 1906; divorced 1922). Berg acted as business manager for the Wright Brothers and on 7 October 1908 his wife was Wilbur Wright's passenger in a two-minute flight at Auvours, near Le Mans, thus becoming the first American woman to fly in a fixed-wing aircraft. The manner in which she tied the hem of her dress on that occasion is said to have influenced the design of the hobble skirt.

Poetry
According to the account published in Walker's Hibernian Magazine of 1804, Ogilby "produced many beautiful little pieces of lyric poetry both original and translations from the Tamul or Malabar languages". An example, "Elma. An Hindoo Lyric Poem translated from the original by Sir David Ogilby which first appeared in the Madras Courier", was printed in the magazine with explanatory footnotes. It seems to have been on the strength of his appearance in Walker's that D. J. O'Donoghue included an entry for Ogilby (whom he described "as a soldier of great distinction in India") in The Poets of Ireland: a Biographical and Bibliographical Dictionary of Irish Writers of English Verse. No other example of verse attributed to Ogilby has found its way into print in Britain.

Portraits
The biographical notice that appeared in Walker's Hibernian Magazine was accompanied by "An Elegant and Animated Portrait" of Ogilby. A portrait of his first wife, taken from a miniature by James Barry, engraved by Edward Scriven and published by Vernor, Hood & Sharpe, was included in The Lady's Monthly Museum’s tribute to her. A later portrait of Ogilby, by William Egley, was exhibited at the Royal Academy in 1824.

Notes

References

1834 deaths
Military personnel from County Londonderry
British military personnel of the Second Anglo-Mysore War
Irish poets
British East India Company Army officers
People from Limavady